Neuropeptide Y receptors are a family of receptors belonging to class A G-protein coupled receptors and they are activated by the closely related peptide hormones neuropeptide Y,  peptide YY and pancreatic polypeptide.  These receptors are involved in the control of a diverse set of behavioral processes including appetite, circadian rhythm, and anxiety.

Activated neuropeptide receptors release the Gi subunit from the heterotrimeric G protein complex.  The Gi subunit in turn inhibits the production of the second messenger cAMP from ATP.

Only the crystal structure of Y1 in complex with two antagonist is available.

Types
There are five known mammalian neuropeptide Y receptors designated Y1 through Y5.  Four neuropeptide Y receptors each encoded by a different gene have been identified in humans, all of which may represent therapeutic targets for obesity and other disorders.
 Y1 - 
 Y2 - 
 Y4 - 
 Y5 -

Antagonists

BIBP-3226
Lu AA-33810
BIIE-0246
UR-AK49

References

External links

 

G protein-coupled receptors